Let's Face It is the fifth studio album by American ska punk band The Mighty Mighty Bosstones. It was released on March 11, 1997 by Mercury Records and Big Rig Records.

The album sold very well due to the success of its single "The Impression That I Get", which reached No. 1 on the Billboard Modern Rock Tracks chart. Also faring well were the album's other two singles, "Royal Oil" (No. 22) and "The Rascal King" (No. 7).  The album itself reached No. 27 on the Billboard 200 (the only Bosstones album to enter the top 50). The album has been certified platinum.

Let's Face It was rereleased on vinyl by Asbestos Records in 2013.

Reception

Let's Face It has received positive reviews. Sputnikmusic's Adam Thomas called the album "a quintessential piece of '90s ska" and concluded that it "shows The Mighty Mighty Bosstones at the top of their game and is one of the greatest ska-punk albums to come out of the nineties." AllMusic's Steve Huey also gave the album a positive review, writing: "Even if the production is a tiny bit slick, and the playing time is rather short... it's still difficult to view Let's Face It as anything but a rousing success and easily one of the band's best albums." Stephen Thompson of The A.V. Club wrote that "for every misfire like the preachy title track, there's an infectious anthem that begs to be blared from every window in the city. Play 'The Rascal King' or 'The Impression That I Get' as loud as you can get away with, and ask yourself if the Bosstones aren't back." David Fricke of Rolling Stone was more reserved in his praise, criticizing the album's "flat" production.

In 2004, Let's Face It was ranked No. 36 in a Kerrang! reader poll of the 50 greatest punk albums.

Track listing

The track "Wrong Thing Right Then" was previously available on the soundtrack to Meet the Deedles.

Personnel
Credits adapted from liner notes.

The Mighty Mighty Bosstones
Dicky Barrett – lead vocals, artwork
Nate Albert – guitar, backing vocals
Joe Gittleman – bass, backing vocals
Tim "Johnny Vegas" Burton – saxophone, backing vocals
Kevin Lenear – saxophone
Dennis Brockenborough – trombone
Joe Sirois – drums
Ben Carr – Bosstone, backing vocals

Additional personnel
Paul Q. Kolderie – production, engineering
Sean Slade – production, engineering
Brian Dwyer – trumpet
Dan McLaughlin – trumpet
John Rosenberg – keyboards, backing vocals
Bob Ludwig  – mastering

Charts

Weekly charts

Year-end charts

Certifications

References

1997 albums
The Mighty Mighty Bosstones albums
Mercury Records albums
Albums produced by Paul Q. Kolderie
Albums produced by Sean Slade